Madge is a surname. Notable people with the surname include:

 Charles Madge (1912–1996), English poet and journalist
 Edward Henry Madge (1901–1970), British malacologist
 Geoffrey Douglas Madge (born 1941), Australian pianist and composer
 John Madge, English sociologist, brother of Charles Madge
 Robert Madge (businessman), entrepreneur and technologist
 Ronald B. Madge (active 1965–2002), Canadian entomologist who worked at the Natural History Museum, London and specialized in the taxonomy of Coleoptera (beetles)
 Steve Madge, birder, author, and bird tour leader

Surnames of English origin